The Union Bank of the Philippines, Inc., more commonly known as UnionBank, is one of the universal banks in the Philippines and the ninth largest bank in the country by assets.

UnionBank is a joint consortium among the Aboitiz Group, Insular Life, and Social Security System. It started operations in 1981 and became a commercial bank on January 19, 1982. In July 1992, UnionBank was granted the license to operate as a universal bank.

History

Founding 
The bank was originally incorporated as “Union Savings and Mortgage Bank” on August 16, 1968. After the initial public offering the bank's shares were listed at the Philippine Stock Exchange (PSE) on June 29, 1992.

Licensing as universal bank 
On July 15, 1992, the bank was granted the license to operate as a universal bank in the Philippines and the bank was changed its current name to Union Bank of the Philippines (UBP).

Mergers and acquisitions 
In 1993, UnionBank merged with International Corporate Bank ("Interbank") and in 2006, another merger with International Exchange Bank ("iBank") followed (after first being denied by iBank).

In 2013, UnionBank acquired City Savings Bank, making City Savings Bank a 100% UnionBank subsidiary and consolidating Aboitiz group's banking units.

Opening of UnionDigital 

In 2021, UnionBank was one of only six applicants licensed by the Bangko Sentral ng Pilipinas to open a digital bank, prior to its announcement of a three-year moratorium on digital bank licenses. This means that UnionBank's new Digital Bank, known as Union Digital Bank (UnionDigital) will be one of only six digital banks in the Philippines for at least three years, alongside Overseas Filipino Bank, Tonik Digital Bank, UNObank, GOtyme, and Maya Bank.

On July 12, 2022, the Bangko Sentral ng Pilipinas granted UnionDigital the Certificate of Authority to Operate. It commenced operations on July 18 as UnionDigital Bank Inc. In November of the same year, UnionBank's digital banking unit EON merged its operations with UnionDigital Bank. however, UnionDigital Bank continued its existing EON's products and services to its customers after a transition.

Launch of crypto services 
UnionBank is one of the first financial institutions in the Philippines to adopt cryptocurrency, and was the first local lender to release its own stablecoin in 2019, named PHX, which gives rural banks easier access to remittance and payments. In 2019, the bank also launched crypto ATMs that allow its account holders with crypto wallets to withdraw cash that is converted from crypto as well as trade on the spot.

In January 2022, there were reports confirming that UnionBank plans to launch crypto trading and custodial services. On 20 January 2022, METACO issued a press release to announce that its digital asset custody solution will be used to manage the bank’s crypto assets.

Subsidiaries and Affiliates
UnionBank is divided into the following subsidiaries and affiliates:

City Savings Bank
First Union Direct
First Union Plans
UBP Capital Corporation
Union Properties
UBX Philippines, Inc.
UnionDigital Bank

Ownership
Aboitiz Equity Ventures: 49.31%
Social Security System: 18.91%
Insular Life Assurance Co., Ltd.: 16.32%
Others: 15.46%

See also
Digital Banks in the Philippines
International Exchange Bank
Land Bank of the Philippines
List of Philippine companies
BancNet (the UnionBank ATM network)

References

Banks established in 1968
Banks of the Philippines
Companies listed on the Philippine Stock Exchange
Companies based in Pasig
https://online.unionbankph.com/ucore/img/rebrand/logo-black.png